Goniothalamus is one of the largest palaeotropical genera of plant in family Annonaceae.

Iban people beliefs 
It is believed by the Iban people that when burnt it repels mosquitoes because of its strong scent and thick smoke it creates. It is also believed to repel evil spirits, it is mostly burned during the night and on days where it is both hot and rainy.

Species list
It contains the following species (divided according to Floristic Region):

Fijian Region (Fiji and New Hebrides)
 Goniothalamus monospermus (A.Gray) R.M.K.Saunders

Indian Region (India and Sri Lanka)
 Goniothalamus gardneri Hook.f. & Thomson
 Goniothalamus hookeri Thwaites
 Goniothalamus rhynchantherus Dunn
 Goniothalamus salicina Hook.f. & Thomson
 Goniothalamus simonsii Hook.f. & Thomson
 Goniothalamus thwaitesii Hook.f. & Thomson
 Goniothalamus wynaadensis Bedd.
 Goniothalamus meeboldii Craib

Indochinese Region (South China extending into North Vietnam, Laos, Thailand and Myanmar)
 Goniothalamus aurantiacus R.M.K. Saunders & Chalermglin
 Goniothalamus chinensis, Merr. & Chun
 Goniothalamus calvicarpus Craib
 Goniothalamus chartaceus H.L.Li
 Goniothalamus cheliensis H.H.Hu
 Goniothalamus elegans Ast
 Goniothalamus expansus Craib
 Goniothalamus griffithii Hook.f. & Thomson
 Goniothalamus laoticus (Finep & Gagnep.) Bân
 Goniothalamus macrocalyx Bân
 Goniothalamus repevensis Pierre ex Finet & Gagnep.
 Goniothalamus rongklanus R.M.K. Saunders & Chalermglin
 Goniothalamus saigonensis Pierre ex Finet & Gagnep.
 Goniothalamus sawtehii C.E.C.Fisch.
 Goniothalamus tamirensis Pierre ex Finet & Gagnep.
 Goniothalamus tavoyensis Chatterjee

Malesian Region (Malaysia, Borneo, New Guinea, Sumatra, Philippines)
 Goniothalamus acehensis R. M. K. Saunders
 Goniothalamus alatus R. M. K. Saunders
 Goniothalamus amuyon (Blanco) Merr.
 Goniothalamus andersonii J.Sinclair
 Goniothalamus calycinus J. Sinclair
 Goniothalamus costulatus Miq.
 Goniothalamus curtisii King
 Goniothalamus dewildei R. M. K. Saunders
 Goniothalamus expansus Craib
synonym: Goniothalamus subevenius King
 Goniothalamus flavus Hook.f. & Thomson
 Goniothalamus giganteus (Wall. ex) Hook.f. & Thomson
 Goniothalamus grandiflorus (Warb.) Boerl.
 Goniothalamus holttumii J. Sinclair
 Goniothalamus latestigma C.E.C.Fisch.
 Goniothalamus loerzingii R. M. K. Saunders
 Goniothalamus longistaminus R. M. K. Saunders
 Goniothalamus macrophyllus (Blume) Hook.f. & Thomson
 Goniothalamus maewongensis R.M.K. Saunders & Chalermglin
 Goniothalamus majestatis Keßler
 Goniothalamus malayanus Hook.f. & Thomson
 Goniothalamus miquelianus R. M. K. Saunders
 Goniothalamus montanus J. Sinclair
 Goniothalamus nitidus Merr.
 Goniothalamus parallelivenius Ridl.
 Goniothalamus puncticulifolius Merr.
 Goniothalamus ridleyi King
 Goniothalamus rotundisepalus M.R. Hend.
 Goniothalamus scortechinii King
 Goniothalamus tapis Miq.
 Goniothalamus tavogensis Chatterjee
 Goniothalamus tenuifolius King
 Goniothalamus tomentosus R.M.K. Saunders
 Goniothalamus tortilipetalus M.R. Hend.
 Goniothalamus undulatus Ridl.
 Goniothalamus uvarioides King
 Goniothalamus velutinus King
 Goniothalamus wrayi Airy Shaw

Neocaledonian Region (New Caledonia)
 Goniothalamus dumontetii R.M.K. Saunders & J. Munzinger
 Goniothalamus obtusatus (Baill.) R.M.K.Saunders

Footnotes

References

Saunders, R.M.K. and Chalermglin, P. 2008. A synopsis of Goniothalamus species  (Annonaceae) in Thailand, with descriptions of three new species. Botanical Journal of the Linnean Society. 156(3): 355–384.

Saunders, R.M.K. 2003. A synopsis of Goniothalamus species (Annonaceae) in Peninsular Malaysia, with a description of a new species. Botanical Journal of the Linnean Society. 142: 321–339.

 
Annonaceae genera
Taxonomy articles created by Polbot